Thomas Falkland Carey (12 February 1903 – 4 December 1966) was an American-born Irish cricketer and British colonial administrator.

Carey was born in California.  A right-handed batsman and right-arm medium pace bowler, he played one first-class match for Dublin University, an innings defeat against Northamptonshire County Cricket Club in June 1924.

He served as British Resident in Brunei from 1931 to 1934. He died in Thorpe St Andrew, Norwich, England, aged 63.

References

1903 births
1966 deaths
Irish cricketers
Dublin University cricketers
Sportspeople from Fresno, California
Place of birth missing
Cricketers from California
Administrators in British Brunei